Faslane (Gaelic: Am Fas Leathann) on Gare Loch is the name of a bay near the village of Garelochhead, and is now the main part of HM Naval Base Clyde in Argyll and Bute, Scotland, as well as being a Defence Logistics Organisation port, operated in dual site organisation with Great Harbour, Greenock, by Serco Denholm.

Faslane is currently home to the United Kingdom's Trident SSBN submarines

There is also Faslane Peace Camp outside the base, protesting since 1982 against the nuclear missiles and submarines there.

History
The immediate area was sparsely populated until a naval base was constructed during World War II, though Garelochhead was already a thriving village served by Clyde steamers and a railway station. A shipbreakers operated at Faslane until the mid-1980s, when its site was taken over by expansion on the naval base.

See also
Faslane Castle, Shandon Castle, and St Michael's Chapel, ruinous sites of two former castles and a chapel, in the area of Faslane

Footnotes

Bays of Argyll and Bute